Roger MacBride Allen (born September 26, 1957) is an American science fiction author. He was born in Bridgeport, Connecticut and grew up outside of Washington, D.C., graduating from Walt Whitman High School. He graduated from Boston University in 1979. His father is American historian and author Thomas B. Allen.

Background
Allen's family moved to Bethesda, Maryland in 1966, when he was nine years old.  He earned a degree in journalism from Boston University, after-which he returned to suburban Washington DC.

Works

Allies and Aliens
The Torch of Honor (1985)
Rogue Powers (1986)
Allies and Aliens (1995) collects The Torch of Honor and Rogue Powers

Hunted Earth
The Ring of Charon (1990)
The Shattered Sphere (1994)
The Falling World (TBA)

Caliban
Isaac Asimov's Caliban (1993)
Isaac Asimov's Inferno (1994)
Isaac Asimov's Utopia (1996)

Chronicles of Solace
The Depths of Time (2000)
The Ocean of Years (2002)
The Shores of Tomorrow (2003)

BSI Starside
BSI Starside: The Cause of Death (2006)
BSI Starside: Death Sentence (2007)
BSI Starside: Final Inquiries (2008)

Corellian (Star Wars)
Star Wars: Ambush at Corellia (1995)
Star Wars: Assault at Selonia (1995)
Star Wars: Showdown at Centerpoint (1995)

Stand-alone novels
Orphan of Creation (1988)
Farside Cannon (1988)
The War Machine: Crisis of Empire III (1989), with David Drake
Supernova (1991), with Eric Kotani
The Modular Man (1992), accompanying the novel is an essay by Isaac Asimov "Intelligent Robots and Cybernetic Organisms."

Historical
Time Capsule: The Book of Record (2010) with Thomas B. Allen
Mr. Lincoln's High Tech War (2008) with Thomas B. Allen

See also
Political ideas in science fiction
Religious ideas in science fiction

References

External links

1957 births
Living people
20th-century American novelists
20th-century American male writers
21st-century American novelists
American male novelists
American science fiction writers
Boston University alumni
Writers from Bridgeport, Connecticut
American male short story writers
20th-century American short story writers
21st-century American short story writers
21st-century American male writers
Novelists from Connecticut